Niaye is a 1964 Senegalese short drama film directed by Sembène Ousmane. It is an adaptation of Vehi-Ciosane ou Blanche-Genèse.

Plot summary 
The pregnancy of a young girl scandalizes her community.

Cast 
 Sow as the Shoemaker
 Astou Ndiaye as the Griote
 Mame Dia as the Mother
 Modo Séne as the Soldier

Production notes 
The film was shot on 16 mm film with the participation of the inhabitants of the village of Keur Haly Sarrata.

External links 
 

Senegalese drama films
1964 films
1964 short films
1964 drama films
Senegalese short films